Puzeh-ye Zard (also Romanized as Pūzeh-ye Zard) is a village in Doreh Rural District, in the Central District of Sarbisheh County, South Khorasan Province, Iran. At the 2006 census, its population was 27, in 8 families.

References 

Populated places in Sarbisheh County